Duke Zane Richardson (born ) is a United States Air Force general serving as the commander of Air Force Materiel Command since June 13, 2022. He most recently served as the military deputy to the Assistant Secretary of the Air Force for Acquisition, Technology and Logistics, and before that was the director of the Presidential & Executive Airlift Directorate at the Air Force Life Cycle Management Center.

Richardson attended Marana High School in Marana, Arizona, graduating in 1982. He enlisted in the Air Force in 1983.

Awards and decorations

Effective dates of promotions

References

Living people
Place of birth missing (living people)
Recipients of the Air Force Distinguished Service Medal
Recipients of the Defense Superior Service Medal
Recipients of the Legion of Merit
United States Air Force generals
1960s births